Alexander J. M. Hunfeld (born 6 April 1949) is a Dutch composer.

The "According to Gurney" 2008-sonatina by Xander Hunfeld was performed by Charles Neidich, Maria Kouznetsova and Martijn Willers in 2013.

Selected works
 Treurmars (2010), for carillon

References

External links
 

1949 births
Living people
Composers for carillon
Conservatorium van Amsterdam alumni
Dutch classical composers
Dutch male classical composers
People from Velsen
Vrije Universiteit Amsterdam alumni